Baldia is a Union in Pirojpur District under Nesarabad (Swarupkati) Upazila in the Barisal Division of southwestern Bangladesh.

References

External links

Populated places in Pirojpur District
Unions of Nesarabad (Swarupkati) Upazila